Dzhidzhikhabl is a rural locality (an aul) and the administrative center of Dzhidzhikhablskoye Rural Settlement of Teuchezhsky District, the Republic of Adygea, Russia. The population was 754 as of 2018. There are 8 streets.

Geography 
The aul is on the shore of the Gulf of Krasnodar Reservoir, 10 km north of Ponezhukay (the district's administrative centre) by road. Tauykhabl is the nearest rural locality.

Ethnicity 
The aul is inhabited by Circassians.

References 

Rural localities in Teuchezhsky District